Saqi Beyg (also Romanized as Sāqī Beyg; also known as Sāqī Bag and Sāqī Beyk) is a village in Sarvelayat Rural District, Sarvelayat District, Nishapur County, Razavi Khorasan Province, Iran. At the 2006 census, its population was 719, in 214 families.

References 

Populated places in Nishapur County